Kafteh Rud (also Romanized as Kafteh Rūd; also known as Kaft Rūd) is a village in Pir Bazar Rural District, in the Central District of Rasht County, Gilan Province, Iran. At the 2006 census, its population was 893, in 247 families.

References 

Populated places in Rasht County